The 1964–65 SV Werder Bremen season is the 55th season in the football club's history and 2nd consecutive and overall season in the top flight of German football, the Bundesliga, having earned qualification for the inaugural season from the Oberliga in 1963, after finishing second in the Oberliga Nord. Werder Bremen also participated in the season's edition of the domestic cup, the DFB-Pokal. The season covers a period from 1 July 1964 to 30 June 1965.

Players

Squad

Transfers

In

Out

Competitions

Overview

Bundesliga

League table

Results summary

Results by round

Matches

DFB-Pokal

Squad statistics

Appearances and goals

! colspan="7" style="background:#DCDCDC; text-align:center" | Goalkeepers
|-

! colspan="7" style="background:#DCDCDC; text-align:center" | Defenders
|-

! colspan="7" style="background:#DCDCDC; text-align:center" | Midfielders
|-

! colspan="7" style="background:#DCDCDC; text-align:center" | Forwards
|-

|}

Goalscorers

Clean sheets

References

SV Werder Bremen seasons
Werder Bremen
German football championship-winning seasons